is a Japanese singer, actor, host, producer, magazine model and a member of KAT-TUN. Born and raised in Edogawa, Tokyo, he joined the Japanese talent agency, Johnny & Associates, at the age of 12.

He was drafted as a member and co-lead vocalist of the popular J-pop group KAT-TUN in 2001. He is also one half of the temporary group, Shūji to Akira, whose only single "Seishun Amigo" became the best-selling single of 2005 in Japan. Individually, he is a popular actor who has played the lead role in several television dramas.

Early life 
Born in Edogawa, Tokyo on February 23, 1986, Kamenashi is the third child of his parents. He has two older brothers, Yūichirō and Kōji, and one younger brother, Yūya. He also has two sisters-in-law and a niece from his second brother's marriage and a nephew from his first brother's marriage. His given name comes from a character from the manga, Touch, written by a Japanese manga artist, Mitsuru Adachi. Coincidentally, bandmate Tatsuya Ueda was also named after the twin brother of Kamenashi's namesake.

An avid baseball fan and player like the character he was named after, Kamenashi once represented his country in the junior world league as shortstop though he had to give up the sport professionally due to lack of spare time after he was accepted into Johnny's Entertainment despite having the support of Johnny Kitagawa, the agency's president, to pursue both careers.

Acting career 
In 2009, Kamenashi was cast in a live-action adaptation of a wine-themed manga, Kami no Shizuku, as the leading actor. Voters awarded him, his co-stars (Riisa Naka and Seiichi Tanabe) and the drama a near clean sweep of the winter edition of the Nikkan Sports Drama Grand Prix Awards in March 2009. He made a guest appearance as a doctor on the third episode of TBS drama series, Mr. Brain, opposite his talent agency senior Takuya Kimura. Kamenashi also made his film debut on July 11, 2009, reprising his role of Ryū Odagiri, now a trainee teacher in Gokusen The Movie. The movie earned half a billion yen in its opening weekend landing at the top spot of the box office and stayed in the top ten for six consecutive weeks. It later ranked at number 16 on Japan's 2009 yearly box office results raking in US$33,963,369 at the end of its run.

In 2010, he was cast in the leading role of Kyohei Takano for a live-action adaptation of popular manga, Yamato Nadeshiko Shichi Henge, which aired on NTV. It was named Best Drama by voters of the 13th Nikkan Sports Drama Grand Prix Awards in March 2010 while Kamenashi and his co-star, Aya Omasa, were also awarded Best Actor and Best Supporting Actress respectively.

In 2011, he took on a role as Bem from the adaptation of anime Yōkai Ningen Bem. He received Best Actor award from Nikkan Sports Drama Grand Prix and Television Drama Academy Awards that year. Following the success of the drama, Yōkai Ningen Bem was made into film in 2012. At the end of its run, the film had grossed US$12,628,578 gross.

In 2013, Kamenashi starred in the movie It's Me, It's Me. The movie premiered in 15th Udine Far East Film Festival Italy in April, and Kamenashi won the My Movie Audience Award.

In 2016, Kamenashi was cast in the drama, The Mysterious Thief Yamaneko, which was based on the novel "Kaito Tantei Yamaneko Series" by Manabu Kaminaga as Yamaneko.

In 2017, he appeared in the drama Boku unmei no hito desu alongside his former co-star from Nobuta wo produce, Tomohisa Yamashita. In March 2017 Kamenashi together with Tao Tsuchiya in Live Action Film popular japanese shojo manga PとJK, Also in May 2017 he co-starring Lily Franky as supporting actor, in an independent film A Beautiful Star (美しい).

In 2018, he was back in filming drama series, taking the lead of Final Cut, (Fuji TV), He also appeared in TV Movie Tegami: Keigo Higashino (東野圭吾 手紙)  Based on the popular novel Tegami by Keigo Higashino.

In 2019, He was cast alongside Fumi Nikaido as main in a re-make of a masterpiece Strawberry Night into Strawberry Night Saga (Fuji TV).

Other endeavors

Modeling and fashion 
Kamenashi walked the runway in 2008 for Hermès' men's autumn/winter 2008 collection in Tokyo. In 2010, Kamenashi won the annual Best Jeanist award with more than 29,000 votes in the men's category, almost triple that of the second runner-up, Masaki Aiba. This is his fifth consecutive win and is thus promoted into the hall of fame, making him Eternal Best Jeanist and ineligible for future runs.

Baseball 
Kamenashi threw the first pitch at the Pacific League opening ceremony for the 2009 baseball season at a match in Chiba City featuring the Chiba Lotte Marines against the Fukuoka SoftBank Hawks on July 19, 2009.

Kamenashi participated in the Central League's Yomiuri Giants 23rd FanFiesta 2009 on November 23, 2009 and led his team to victory. He participated during the 1st inning as shortstop and for the 2nd and 3rd innings as pitcher. He belonged to the Black Rose Variety Team led by SMAP's Nakai Masahiro against the Giants Select Members Team.

In 2012, he was given the opportunity to do live coverage of Major League Baseball between Oakland Athletics and Yomiuri Giants. He also threw the ceremonial pitch against Jemile Weeks.

Kamenashi is a commentator and host on the sports shows Going! Sports&News and Dramatic Game.

Discography

Singles

Solo songs

Filmography

Film

TV dramas

TV programs

Live performances

Stage shows

Concerts

Awards

References

External links 
 

Johnny & Associates
KAT-TUN members
Japanese male pop singers
Japanese idols
Japanese television personalities
Living people
1986 births
People from Edogawa, Tokyo
Singers from Tokyo
21st-century Japanese singers
21st-century Japanese male singers
Japanese male actors